Divens is a surname. Notable people with the surname include:

Brad Divens, American rock musician
Lamar Divens (born 1985), American football player

See also
Diven (surname)